Uncharacterized protein C16orf78(NP_653203.1) is a protein that in humans is encoded by the chromosome 16 open reading frame 78 gene.

Gene 
The C16orf78 gene(123970) is located at 16q12.1 on the plus strand, spanning 25,609 bp from 49,407,734 to 49,433,342.

mRNA 
There is one mRNA transcript (NM_144602.3) and no other known splice isoforms. There are 5 exons, totaling a length of 1068 base pairs.

Protein

Sequence 
C16orf78 is 265 amino acids long with a predicted molecular weight of 30.8 kDal and pI of 9.8. It is rich in both methionine and lysine, composed of 6.4% methionine and 13.6% lysine. This methionine richness has been hypothesized to serve as a mitochondrial antioxidant.

Post-Transnational Modifications 
There are four verified ubiquitination sites and three verified phosphorylation sites.

Structure 
Predictions of C16orf78's secondary structure consist primarily of alpha helices and coiled coils. Phyre2 also predicted C16orf78 is primarily helical, but 253 of 265 amino acids were modeled ab initio so the confidence of the model is low.

Subcellular Localization 
C16orf78 is predicted to be localized to the cell nucleus. There is also a predicted bipartite nuclear localization signal.

Expression 
C16orf78 has restricted expression toward the testis, with much lower expression in other tissues.

Interaction 
C16orf78 has a physical association with DNA/RNA-binding protein KIN17 (NP_036443.1), suggesting C16orf78 may also play a role in DNA repair.  C16orf78 was found to be phosphorylated by SRPK1(NP_003128.3) and SPRK2 (AAH68547.1).

Clinical Significance 
Deletion of the C16orf78 gene has been identified as a determinant of prostate cancer. A SNP in C16orf78 interacts with a SNP in LMTK2 and is associated with risk of prostate cancer.

Amplification of the C16orf78 gene has been linked to metabolically adaptive cancer cells. A duplication of the C16orf78 gene was associated with at least one case of Rolandic Epilepsy.

Homology

Paralogs 
C16orf78 has no known paralogs in humans.

Orthologs 
C16orf78 has over 80 orthologs, including animals as distant Ciona intestinalis(XP_002132057.1), which is estimated to have diverged from humans 676 million years ago. C16orf78 has orthologs in many types of mammals, reptiles, bony fish, and even some invertebrates, but has no known orthologs in amphibians or birds. Below is a table with samples of orthologs, with divergence dates from TimeTree and similarity calculated by pairwise sequence alignment.

References

External links 

 

Proteins
Genes on human chromosome 16